The 1974 Dutch Open was a men's tennis tournament staged at 't Melkhuisje in Hilversum, Netherlands that was part of the Group C tier of the 1974 Commercial Union Assurance Grand Prix circuit. The tournament was played on outdoor clay courts and was held from 21 July until 28 July 1974. It was the 18th edition of the tournament. First-seeded Guillermo Vilas won the singles title and earned $5,000 first-prize money. For the first time no women's events were held.

Finals

Singles
 Guillermo Vilas defeated  Barry Phillips-Moore 6–4, 6–2, 1–6, 6–3
 It was Vilas' 2nd singles title of the year and the 3rd of his career.

Doubles
 Tito Vázquez /  Guillermo Vilas defeated  Lito Álvarez /  Julián Ganzábal 6–2, 3–6, 6–1, 6–2

References

External links
 ITF tournament edition details

Dutch Open (tennis)
Dutch Open (tennis)
Dutch Open
Dutch Open
Dutch Open (tennis), 1974